Back Hye-ryun (born 17 February 1967) is a South Korean prosecutor-turned parliamentarian.

From 2000, she worked as a state prosecutor. In 2011, she resigned the post to publicly criticise political favouritism of Prosecution Service towards the Lee Myung-bak government. In 2012, she became the member of then-opposition party, Democratic United Party.

After winning the election in 2016, she took several roles in her party such as its deputy floor leader from May 2016 to May 2017 and its spokesperson from May 2017 to August 2018. From October 2018, she has led the women's committee of her party. As an ex-prosecutor, her legislative agenda focused on reforming the prosecution service.

On 2 May 2021, Back was elected one of five elected members of the Supreme Council of her party receiving third most votes among seven candidates.

Back holds a bachelor's degree in sociology from Korea University.

Electoral history

References 

1967 births
Living people
Korea University alumni
Minjoo Party of Korea politicians
Members of the National Assembly (South Korea)
20th-century South Korean women politicians
20th-century South Korean politicians
South Korean prosecutors
People from South Jeolla Province
Female members of the National Assembly (South Korea)